Dr. Majida Alazazi is the first Emirati woman to receive a DBA in supply chain management and industries from the UAE University. She started out in business in 2004 and later moved to the automotive industry. Her main objective was to support the country economically by exporting a national car. Majida has worked for 21 years in the areas of Supply Chain Management, Commercial Contracts, Procurement and Operations.

As of 2019, she is the founder and chief executive officer of Sandstorm Automotive.

References

External links
sandstorm-auto.com

Emirati women in business
United Arab Emirates University alumni
Supply chain management
Corporate executives in the automobile industry
Year of birth missing (living people)
Living people